Malaysia competed at the 2012 Summer Olympics in London, from 27 July to 12 August 2012. This was the nation's fourteenth appearance at the Olympics, although it had previously competed in two other games under the name Malaya. Malaysia did not participate at the 1980 Summer Olympics in Moscow, because of its partial support to the United States boycott. Ahmad Sarji Abdul Hamid was the Chef de Mission of the national delegation at the Games.

Olympic Council of Malaysia sent a total of 29 athletes to the Games, 16 men and 13 women, to compete in 9 sports. This was also the youngest delegation in Malaysia's Olympic history, with more than half under the age of 25, and many of them were expected to reach their peak in time for the 2016 Olympics in Rio de Janeiro. Nine Malaysian athletes had competed in Beijing, including platform diver Pandelela Rinong, who was appointed by the council to carry the nation's flag at the opening ceremony. Diver Yeoh Ken Nee, on the other hand, made his Olympic return in London, after a twelve-year absence. For the first time since its official Olympic debut, Malaysia did not qualify athletes in taekwondo.
 
This was Malaysia's most successful Olympics outing since the 1996 Atlanta Olympics and was surpassed by their results in 2016 Rio Olympics, winning a total of 2 medals. Flagbearer Pandelela Rinong made history as the first Malaysian woman to win an Olympic medal and the first Malaysian athlete to win an Olympic medal in any event besides badminton, when she took the bronze medal in women's 10 meter platform diving. Meanwhile, badminton player Lee Chong Wei, repeated his silver medal victory from Beijing, becoming the first Malaysian athlete to hold more than one Olympic medal.

Medalists

| width=78% align=left valign=top |

| width="22%" align="left" valign="top" |

Archery

Malaysia has qualified three archers for the men's individual event, a team for the men's team event and one archer for the women's individual event.

Athletics

Malaysia has selected two athletes by wildcard.

Key
 Note – Ranks given for track events are within the athlete's heat only
 Q = Qualified for the next round
 q = Qualified for the next round as a fastest loser or, in field events, by position without achieving the qualifying target
 NR = National record
 N/A = Round not applicable for the event
 Bye = Athlete not required to compete in round

Men

Women

Badminton

Cycling

Road

Track
Sprint

Keirin

Diving

Malaysia has qualified 9 quota spots in diving, 2 each from 2011 World Aquatics Championships in Shanghai and Asian Diving Cup in Kuala Lumpur and 5 from the 2012 Diving World Cup.

Men

Women

Fencing

Malaysia has qualified 1 fencer.

Men

Sailing

Malaysia has qualified 1 boat for each of the following events

Men

M = Medal race; EL = Eliminated – did not advance into the medal race;

Shooting

Malaysia has ensured berths in the following events of shooting:

Women

Swimming

Malaysian swimmers have so far achieved qualifying standards in the following events (up to a maximum of 2 swimmers in each event at the Olympic Qualifying Time (OQT), and potentially 1 at the Olympic Selection Time (OST)):

Women

References

2012 in Malaysian sport
2012
Nations at the 2012 Summer Olympics